The Cursed Medallion (also released as The Night Child) is a 1975 Italian horror film directed by Massimo Dallamano, and starring Richard Johnson, Joanna Cassidy, and Ida Galli.

Plot 
Michael Williams, a documentary filmmaker for the BBC, is working on a project involving depictions of Satan and demonic-inspired deaths in works of art. His wife perished in what was ruled an accidental fire, and he now raises his preadolescent daughter, Emily, with assistance from a devoted governess, Jill, both of whom are still haunted by the death. Michael's obsession with a specific painting sends him to Italy, and his family doctor suggests Michael take his daughter and governess along to help them recover. While packing for the trip, Emily finds a medallion that he had bought for his wife on a previous trip, and in turn, he allows her to keep it. On arriving in Italy, they are met by American production manager Joanna, who soon becomes romantically drawn to Michael.

When Michael meets with art historian and self-professed psychic Countess Cappelli, she begs him not to inquire further about the painting, but to no avail. After an initial shoot at an abandoned gallery where the painting resides, the developed film shows what seems to be an ectoplasmic presence the crew had not seen when they shot it. When Michael and Joanna return late at night to figure out why this happens, Emily has a nightmare of them in danger, and concurrent with her hysterics, a statue falls, almost killing the couple. The rubble reveals a double-edged sword and a duplicate of Emily's medallion, previously hidden inside. Emily's behavior, in general, becomes more unpredictable, such as taking up smoking and playing piano when she previously had little skill, and unpleasant, particularly towards Joanna. The Countess warns of danger to everyone based on these discoveries and a tarot reading, but Michael dismisses her worry.

Joanna, sensing that governess Jill has also harbored feelings for Michael, tries to foster conviviality by taking everyone out for an afternoon of play in a cliffside park. The initially pleasant outing turns tragic when an unseen assailant pushes Jill off the cliff to her death in the rapid water below. Michael and Emily return to England for Jill's funeral, with the Countess begging them not to return. Emily also asks not to be taken back to Italy, but Michael intends to finish his documentary and solve the mystery of the painting. In their absence, the Countess returns to the gallery. She discovers someone has painted over elements of the painting that revealed a young girl resembling Emily possessing the sword and the medallion and has a vision of Michael pounding on the gallery's doors. She also has a vision of a girl playing piano and hiding letters in its body from another time. She uncovers an abandoned piano and finds the letters still there.

Returning to Italy, Michael asks Joanna to stay with them to keep watch on Emily. He meets with the Countess once more, and she shows him the letters, which detail how the girl in her vision, named Emilia, succumbed to demonic possession and killed her family. She urges him to get to Emily if he hopes to save her. Meanwhile, in full throes of a possession spurred by the medallion, Emily tries to kill Joanna by starting a fire in her bedroom with heating oil. Michael arrives in time to stop the fire, but Emily runs off during his save of Joanna. Emily gets into the gallery and is horrified to discover that she is responsible for the deaths of both her governess and her mother; she takes the sword and stabs the painting in manic terror. Michael finds her, and Emily runs to embrace him, seemingly unaware she holds the double-edged sword, which kills them.

Cast 
 Richard Johnson as Michael Williams
 Joanna Cassidy as Joanna Morgan
 Evelyn Stewart (Ida Galli) as  Jill Perkins
 Nicoletta Elmi as  Emily Williams, the Night Child
 Edmund Purdom  as The Doctor 
 Riccardo Garrone as  Police Inspector 
 Dana Ghia as  Mother of Emily
 Lila Kedrova as  Countess Cappelli

Production
The Cursed Medallion was originally titled La bambina e il suo diavolo [Emily]. It had a story written by the husband and wife writing team of Franco Marotta and Laura Toscano along with director Massimo Dallamano.

Shooting for the film started on October 28, 1974. The film was shot in Spoleto, Villa Parisi, Palazzo Chigi and London. Some sources state that the film was an Italian and British co-production, but the films companies involved who officially produced it were Italian.

Release
The Cursed Medallion was released in Italy as Il medaglione insanguinato (Perché?!) on 22 May 1975 where it was distributed by Italian International Film. It was released in the United States in March 1976. The film has had the English-language titles The Night Child and The Cursed Medallion.

In 2005 the film was restored and shown as part of the retrospective "Homage to Fulvio Lucisano" at the 62nd Venice International Film Festival.

See also   
 List of Italian films of 1975

References

Works cited

External links

1975 films
1975 horror films
Italian horror films
1970s Italian-language films
English-language Italian films
1970s English-language films
Films directed by Massimo Dallamano
Films scored by Stelvio Cipriani
Films set in London
Films set in Italy
Films shot in London
Films shot in Italy
1970s Italian films